Teshovo is a village in Hadzhidimovo Municipality, in Blagoevgrad Province, Bulgaria.

References

Villages in Hadzhidimovo Municipality